Karl Anders "Kalle" Moraeus (born 15 July 1963) is a Swedish musician, actor, composer and television presenter.

Moraeus was born in Mora. He is a member of the folk group Orsa Spelmän and Benny Anderssons Orkester, founded by former ABBA member Benny Andersson. Amongst numerous recordings with these bands, he has also released a couple of solo albums, most recently album and single Underbart, both being successful in the Swedish charts in 2010.

Discography

Solo albums

Compilation albums

Collaborative albums 
2001: Live in Köttsjön - Kalle & Bengan
2003: Bitå - Kalle Moreaus & Hej Kalle
2005: Julens bästa vänner - Kalle & Bengan

Singles

Filmography 

1994: Illusioner
1999: Adam & Eva
2006: Nisse Hults historiska snedsteg (TV series)

References

External links
 Kalle Moraeus: The Face of Orsa Orsa Kommun official site

1963 births
20th-century Swedish male actors
20th-century Swedish male singers
21st-century Swedish male actors
21st-century Swedish male singers
Male violinists
Male classical violinists
Living people
Swedish classical violinists
Swedish classical violists
Swedish fiddlers
Swedish folk singers
Swedish guitarists
Male guitarists
Swedish mandolinists
Swedish singer-songwriters
Swedish television hosts
Swedish violinists
Swedish violists
21st-century classical violinists
20th-century violists
21st-century violists
Melodifestivalen contestants of 2018
Melodifestivalen contestants of 2010